The following is a list of the islands of Brazil.

Atlantic Ocean islands
Arquipelago de Fernando de Noronha
Arquipélago de São Pedro e São Paulo (Saint Peter and Saint Paul Archipelago)
Atol das Rocas (Rocas Atoll)
Alcatrazes Archipelago
Cagarras Archipelago
Ilha do Algodão
Ilha de Boipeba
Ilha de Maraca
Ilha Montão de Trigo
Ilha da Queimada Grande
Ilha de Santa Bárbara
Ilha de Santa Catarina
Ilha de Santo Amaro
Ilha de São Luís
Ilha Grande
Ilha Itaparica
Ilha de Tinharé
Ilha Trindade
Ilhabela Archipelago
Ilha de São Sebastião
Ilha de Itamaracá
Ilha Comprida
Martim Vaz Archipelago
Vitória Archipelago
Ilha de Vitória

Amazon delta islands

Bananal Island
Grande de Gurupá Island
Marajó
Tupinambarana

City islands

Couves Island
Ilha Fiscal (Fiscal Island)

Other islands

Brazilian Island

See also

Coastline of Brazil
Geography of Brazil
Lake island
List of islands by area
List of islands by highest point
List of islands by population
List of islands in the Atlantic Ocean
List of islands of South America
Outline of Brazil

External links

Islands of the Brazil @ United Nations Environment Programme

World island information @ WorldIslandInfo.com

Islands
Brazil